Beaver County is a municipal district in central-east Alberta, Canada. It is centred on Holden in the western part of Census Division No. 10. Its municipal office is located in Ryley.

Beaver County was incorporated as a municipal district on July 31, 1999, and the name was changed from "County of Beaver No. 9" to "Beaver County".

Geography

Communities and localities 
The following urban municipalities are surrounded by Beaver County.
Cities
none
Towns
Tofield
Viking
Villages
Holden
Ryley
Summer villages
none

The following hamlets are located within Beaver County.
Hamlets
Bruce
Kinsella

The following localities are located within Beaver County.
Localities 

Aspen Estates
Bardo
Beaver Creek Estates
Beaver Meadow Estates
Beaverhill Estates
Birch Grove Estates
Cinnamon Ridge Estates
Country Squire
Dodds
El Greco Estates
Forest Glenn
Haight
Islet Lake Estates
Joyland and Jade Estates
Kingsway Estates

Lindbrook
Lindbrook Estates
Lori Estates
Meadowbrook Estates
Miquelon Estates
Park Glen Estates
Philips
Phillips
Poe
Rolling Glory Estates
Royal Glenn Estates
Shonts
Torlea
Whispering Hills

Lakes located within Beaver County
Olivia Lake

Demographics 

In the 2016 Census of Population conducted by Statistics Canada, Beaver County had a population of 5,905 living in 2,177 of its 2,381 total private dwellings, a  change from its 2011 population of 5,689.

Attractions 
Two parks with campgrounds are located in the county's limits, Black Nugget Lake (located between Tofield and Ryley, south of Highway 14) and Camp Lake (located east of Viking, between Kinsella and Innisfree).

See also 
List of communities in Alberta
List of municipal districts in Alberta

References

External links 

 
Municipal districts in Alberta